Océan was a wooden-hulled, armored frigate built for the French Navy in the mid to late 1860s and the lead ship of her class. She was commissioned in 1870 to participate in the Franco-Prussian War and was assigned to the Baltic Squadron that unsuccessfully attempted to blockade Prussian ports in the Baltic Sea. The ship later served in both the Northern and Mediterranean Squadrons before being discarded in 1894.

Design and description
The s were designed by Henri Dupuy de Lôme as an improved version of the s. The ships were central battery ironclads with the armament concentrated amidships. For the first time in a French ironclad three watertight iron bulkheads were fitted in the hull. Like most ironclads of their era they were equipped with a metal-reinforced ram.

Her crew numbered between 750 and 778 officers and men.

Propulsion
The Océan-class ships had one horizontal return connecting rod compound steam engine driving a single propeller. Their engines were powered by eight oval boilers. On sea trials the engine produced  and Océan reached .

Armament
These ships had their main armament mounted in four barbettes on the upper deck, one gun at each corner of the battery, with the remaining guns on the battery deck below the barbettes. Océans original armament consisted of four  guns in the barbettes, and on the battery deck, four  and four  guns. This was upgraded to four  guns in the barbettes and eight  guns on the battery deck before she was commissioned.

At some point the ship received a dozen  Hotchkiss 5-barrel revolving guns. They had a rate of fire of about 30 rounds per minute. The hull was not recessed to enable any of the guns on the battery deck to fire forward or aft. However, the guns mounted in the barbettes sponsoned out over the sides of the hull did have some ability to fire fore and aft. Late in the ship's career four above-water  torpedo tubes were added.

Armor
The Ocean-class ships had a complete  wrought iron waterline belt. The unarmored portions of their sides were protected by  iron plates. Gardiner says that the barbette armor was later removed to improve their stability, but this is not confirmed by any other source.

Service
Océan was laid down at Brest in July 1865 and launched on 15 October 1868. The ship began her sea trials on 3 December 1869, but was not commissioned until 21 July 1870 for service during the Franco-Prussian War of 1870–71. Océan was assigned to the Northern Squadron that attempted to blockade Prussian ports on the Baltic until the squadron was ordered to return to Cherbourg on 16 September 1870.

Afterward she was assigned to the Evolutionary Squadron until 1875 when she was placed in reserve. Océan was recommissioned in 1879 for service with the Mediterranean Squadron. She had a lengthy refit in 1884–85 and was assigned to the Northern Squadron after it was completed. Around 1888 the ship was transferred back to the Mediterranean Squadron until she was reduced to reserve around 1891. Océan was assigned to the Gunnery School that same year and later became a training ship for naval apprentices before being condemned in 1894.

Footnotes

References

External links

  classe Océan

Ships built in France
1868 ships
Océan-class ironclads